KVVZ (100.7 MHz) is a commercial FM radio station licensed to San Rafael, California, and serving the San Francisco area. The station is owned by TelevisaUnivision, through licensee Univision Radio Bay Area, Inc.  It simulcasts a Spanish Contemporary radio format with sister station 105.7 KVVF Santa Clara.  The studios are in San Jose.

KVVZ has an effective radiated power (ERP) of 6,000 watts.  The transmitter is on Robert Dollar Drive in San Rafael.

History

KTIM-FM
The station first signed on the air on August 23, 1961.  The original call sign was KTIM-FM, and it broadcast at 100.9 MHz. The station was owned by Marin Broadcasting Co. In the early 1970s, the station simulcast the MOR format of KTIM during the day, and aired a progressive rock format at night. In the mid 1970s, the station began airing an album-oriented rock format full time. 

The album rock format continued through the rest of the 1970s and into the 1980s.  In 1980, the station was sold to Platt Communications, and in 1983 the station was sold to Arthur Astor. In the mid 1980s, the station began airing an adult contemporary format. On October 20, 1987, the station's call sign was changed to KTID.

Classical, Christian and Reggaeton
In 1994, KTID-FM dropped adult contemporary for classical music and ended its simulcast of KTID (AM).

Between 1999 and 2004, the station was KJQI, later KSFB, airing Contemporary Christian music as 100.7 K-JOY (later "The Bridge"). Between 2004 and June 27, 2005, KVVZ began simulcasting with KVVF and became a Spanish-language "pop, rock y reggaeton" station, Viva 100.7. KVVF was acquired by Univision, which later assumed the license of KVVZ in a trade from Salem Communications in 2004. WPPN in Chicago also went to Univision, while stations in Houston, Dallas and Chicago went to Salem. The Dallas station has since been resold. 

On October 13, 2011, KVVF's branding as "La Kalle" changed to "Latino Mix."  On March 14, 2014, the station began stunting by playing Nelly's "Hot in Herre" uninterrupted.

Rhythmic Contemporary
On March 17, 2014, KVVZ and KVVF started broadcasting at 5:05pm, beginning with a "history lesson" about the first "Hot" station that covered the San Jose area from 1987 to 1995, followed by the return of Chuy Gomez, a radio host formerly from KMEL, and aired a Mix Show. Although the playlist favored R&B/Hip-Hop hits, KVVF/KVVZ was programmed as a Rhythmic Top 40 and targeted a bilingual and younger Hispanic audience using the same formula as sister station KBBT San Antonio. 

In a statement from Station Content Director Makr Arias, “We just feel like The Bay Area has been asking for something new and fresh. It’s a format they call Top 40/Rhythmic with a little bit of hip-hop, R&B and Top 40 crossed-over.”

Return of "Latino Mix" 
On August 30, 2019, the station started stunting by playing J Balvin's "Reggaeton" followed by Vicente Fernández "Volver Volver" uninterrupted, to introduce a comeback to "Latino Mix 100.7."

On September 2, 2019, Latino Mix 100.7 started broadcasting at 12:03pm.  The first song played under the return to the Spanish CHR format was J Balvin's "Mi Gente".

Translator
In addition to the main station, KVVZ was relayed over a period of time by this translator to widen its broadcast area. The translator's license was cancelled by the Federal Communications Commission on August 14, 2020.

References

External links

VVZ
Univision Radio Network stations
San Rafael, California
Radio stations established in 1961
VVZ
Contemporary hit radio stations in the United States
Latin rhythmic radio stations